Lenny Borges (born 30 April 2001) is a German professional footballer who plays as a right-back for German club Holstein Kiel II. He is a Germany youth international.

Club career
Borges was born in Salzwedel and played youth football with Lüneburger SK Hansa and Hamburger SV. Borges joined the AC Milan academy for an undisclosed fee in September 2019.

He joined Bayern Munich II on a season-long loan in September 2020.

International career
Borges has played for Germany at under-17 and under-18.

References

External links
 
 
 

2001 births
Living people
German footballers
People from Salzwedel
Footballers from Saxony-Anhalt
Association football defenders
3. Liga players
A.C. Milan players
FC Bayern Munich II players
German expatriate footballers
German expatriate sportspeople in Italy
Expatriate footballers in Italy